The Adult Literacy Index (ALI) is a statistical measure used to determine how many adults can read and write in a certain area or nation. Adult literacy is one of the factors in measuring the Human Development Index (HDI) of each nation, along with life expectancy, education, and standard of living.

The equation for calculating the Adult Literacy Index is

ALR = Adult Literacy Rate (ages 15 and older)

See also
 Human Development Index
 List of countries by literacy rate
 Literacy

External links
 Adult literacy rates of Great Britain

Literacy
Adult education